Lava Temple is a Hindu place of worship dedicated to the Hindu deity Lava, the son of Rama. It is in Lahore Fort, Lahore, Pakistan, and dates to the Sikh period. According to a Hindu legend, Lahore is named after him.

Etymology 

In the Deshwa Bhaga, Lahore is called 'Lavpor', which points to its origin from Lav, the son of Rama. In the ancient annals of Rajputana, the name given is 'Loh Kot', meaning “the fort of Loh” which, again, has reference to its founder, Rama's son.

History 
A legend based on oral traditions holds that 'Lahore', known in ancient times as 'Lavapuri' (City of Lava in Sanskrit), was founded by Prince Lava,
the son of Sita and Rama. Kasur was founded by his twin brother Prince Kusha.

To this day, Lahore Fort has a vacant temple dedicated to Lava (also pronounced Loh, hence Loh-awar or "The Fort of Loh").

Management 
Currently this temple is under the control of Pakistan Government and is managed by the Pakistan Hindu Council.

See also

 Hinduism in Pakistan
 Evacuee Trust Property Board
 Pakistan Hindu Council 
 Krishna Mandir, Lahore
 Valmiki Mandir, Lahore
 Temples in Lahore

References 

Hindu temples in Lahore
Shrines in Lahore
2006 in Pakistan
Political history of Pakistan
History of Lahore (1947–present)